Jerry Bert Richardson (born November 13, 1941)  is a former American football player who played four seasons on the NFL. He played two seasons with the Rams and two with the Atlanta Falcons. He played college football at West Texas A&M University for the West Texas A&M Buffaloes football team. He was drafted by the Rams of the National Football League in the third round of the 1964 NFL Draft, and drafted by the Denver Broncos of the American Football League in the seventh round of the 1964 AFL Draft.

References

1941 births
Living people
Players of American football from California
American football defensive backs
Los Angeles Rams players
Atlanta Falcons players
West Texas A&M Buffaloes football players